Middletown is a town in Newport County, Rhode Island, United States. The population was 17,075 at the 2020 census. It lies to the south of Portsmouth and to the north of Newport on Aquidneck Island, hence the name "Middletown".

History
Various issues including unjust taxation and a growing population caused the freeholders living in the northern section of Newport to petition the general assembly for independence. As a result of the petition, the land that Middletown occupies was set apart in 1731. The town was incorporated in 1743.

During the 1980s, large sections of East Main Road and West Main Road running through Middletown began to be commercialized, and by the late 1990s, the area had become Aquidneck Island's central business district.

Geography
According to the United States Census Bureau, the town has a total area of 14.9 square miles (38.7 km2), of which 13.0 square miles (33.6 km2) is land and 2.0 square miles (5.1 km2; 13.18%) is water. Middletown was known as the "farming community" of Aquidneck Island. Today most of the developed land is located towards the western part of the town, while what is left of its rural heritage is primarily towards the east. Middletown also has several beaches.

The census-designated place of Newport East and part of the Melville CDP lie within the town boundaries.

Parks and beaches
Middletown is home to Sachuest Point National Wildlife Refuge, as well as two beaches: 

 Sachuest Beach (locally known as Second Beach), a south-facing beach with concessions, showers, and bathrooms. The west part is known as Surfer's End.
 Third Beach is an east-facing beach with fewer waves, grills, and picnic tables.

Town parks in Middletown include:
 Demery Memorial Park
 Dunlap-Wheeler Park
 Middletown Valley Park
 Paradise Valley Park

Government

The town is governed by a seven-member town council, elected at-large in partisan elections. Executive authority is vested in an appointed town administrator (on the council–manager model). The town also elects a non-partisan school committee.

At the state level, Middletown is part of one state senate and three state house districts. The 12th Rhode Island Senate district, which also includes parts of Newport, Little Compton and Tiverton, is held by Democrat Louis P. DiPalma. In the Rhode Island House of Representatives, Middletown forms part of the 72nd, 73rd, and 74th districts. The 72nd, which also includes a portion of Portsmouth, is represented by Democrat Terri Cortvriend. The 73rd, which is predominantly Newport, is held by Democrat Marvin Abney. The 74th, shared between Middletown and Jamestown, is represented by Democrat Deb Ruggiero.

Demographics

At the 2000 census, there were 17,334 people, 6,993 households and 4,643 families residing in the town. The racial makeup of the town was 89.12% White, 2.72% African American, 2.36% Native American, 1.18% Asian, 1.11% Pacific Islander, 1.07% from other races, and 2.43% from two or more races. Hispanic or Latino of any race were 2.93% of the population.

There were 6,993 households, of which 32.9% had children under the age of 18 living with them, 53.9% were married couples living together, 9.8% had a female householder with no husband present, and 33.6% were non-families. Of all households 28.7% were made up of individuals, and 10.9% had someone living alone who was 65 years of age or older. The average household size was 2.43 and the average family size was 3.01.

Of the population, 25.0% were under the age of 18, 6.6% from 18 to 24, 30.9% from 25 to 44, 22.6% from 45 to 64, and 14.9% who were 65 years of age or older. The median age was 38 years. For every 100 females, there were 94.8 males. For every 100 females age 18 and over, there were 89.7 males.

The median household income was $51,075 and the median family income was $57,322. Males had a median income of $41,778 and females $27,229. The per capita income for the town was $25,857. About 3.7% of families and 5.0% of the population were below the poverty line, including 6.2% of those under age 18 and 4.7% of those age 65 or over.

Transportation 
Newport State Airport, a public-use general aviation airport and the only airport on Aquidneck Island, is located in Middletown.

West Main Road (RI-114) and East Main Road (RI-138) are the main roads running north–south through Middletown.

Sports

Middletown is home to St Columba's Cricket Club, which hosts an annual cricket tournament for teams throughout the New England area. The Newport National Golf Club is located in Middletown. The town is also home to the Middletown Islanders hockey, football, baseball, volleyball, and lacrosse teams. They also are involved with Pop Warner football and cheerleading. More known as a middle school football league, Pop Warner hosts from very young ages and separates them by age.

 Kids ages 6–8: Mighty Mights
 Kids ages 9 & 10: Junior Pee Wee
 Kids ages 11 & 12: Pee Wee
 Kids ages 13 & 14: Midget

Schools

As of September 2009, the Middletown Public School District consists of four schools serving pre-kindergarten through 12th grade. They are Aquidneck Elementary School (grades Pre-K to 3), Forest Avenue Elementary School (grades K–3), Joseph H. Gaudet Middle School (grades 4–8) and Middletown High School (grades 9–12). Starting in September 2009, all fourth grade students will attend Joseph H. Gaudet Middle School. John F. Kennedy, former elementary school, will be closed at the end of the 2008–2009 school year due to budget cuts.

Middletown is also home to private schools, including All Saints Academy (grades K–8), a Catholic school, and St. George's School (grades 9–12).

Historic sites in Middletown

 Boyd's Windmill, built 1810
 Bailey Farm, built 1838
 Clambake Club of Newport, built in 1895
 Gardiner Pond Shell Midden
 Hamilton Hoppin House, built in 1856
 Lyman C. Joseph House, built 1882
 Norman Bird Sanctuary, central house built 
 Paradise School, built 1875
 Prescott Farm, 
 Whitehall (Rhode Island), built 1729
 Witherbee School, built 1900

Notable people

 Israel T. Almy, Fall River architect, born in Middletown
 George Berkeley (a.k.a. Bishop Berkeley), 18th century Anglo-Irish philosopher; known for his doctrine of immaterialism; lived in Middletown
 Edwin Booth, actor, built summer cottage "Boothden" in Middletown in 1884 
 Nicolas Cage, actor, once lived in Middletown
 Billy Cowsill, singer-songwriter, musician and record producer; born in Middletown (1948)
 Charlie Day, actor (It's Always Sunny in Philadelphia); grew up in Middletown
 Charles A. Flynn, retired United States Army General, born in Middleton (1963)
 Michael T. Flynn, retired United States Army Lieutenant General, former National Security Advisor to President Donald Trump and former Director of the Defense Intelligence Agency under President Barack Obama; born in Middletown (1958)
 Richard Hatch, Survivor contestant, grew up in Middletown
 Obadiah Holmes, colonial Baptist minister; ancestor of President Abraham Lincoln; lived and is buried in a section of Newport annexed by Middletown
 John Huston, film director, screenwriter and actor (Moulin Rouge (1952), Key Largo); Oscar winner (The Treasure of the Sierra Madre); died in Middletown (1987)

In popular culture
 Portions of the 2012 romantic drama Celeste and Jesse Forever were filmed in several locations throughout the state, notably on Middletown's Sachuest Bay shoreline off Tuckerman Avenue.

See also

References

External links

 Town of Middletown official website
 Middletown Historical Society
 Middletown Public School District

 
Towns in Newport County, Rhode Island
Narragansett Bay
Populated coastal places in Rhode Island
Providence metropolitan area
Towns in Rhode Island